The Communal police (formerly Комунална полиција, Komunalna policija) is in Serbia a local law-enforcement agency under jurisdiction of a city, a type of municipal police. The municipal police is responsible for securing the implementation of tasks that are within the jurisdiction of the city or municipality.

Jurisdiction
 Maintenance of municipal (and other legally regulated) order of importance for communal activities.
 Exercising control over the application of laws and other regulations and general acts of communal areas and other activities under the jurisdiction of the city.
 Exercising of supervision in urban, suburban and other local traffic, in accordance with law and regulations of the city.
 Protection environmental, cultural goods, local roads, streets and other public facilities of importance for the city.
 Support implementing regulations that will ensure the smooth flow of life in the city, preservation of city resources and perform other tasks from jurisdiction of the city;
Exercising control over the application of law about appearance of the symbols of the Republic of Serbia, excluding state, provincial and local authorities.

See also
 Law enforcement in Serbia

References

External links
 Ministry of Human and Minority Rights, Public Administration and Local Self-Government

 
Municipal law enforcement agencies